Haploglossa is a genus of beetles belonging to the family Staphylinidae.

The species of this genus are found in Europe and Northern America.

Species:
 Haploglossa barberi (Fenyes, 1921) 
 Haploglossa gentilis (Märkel, 1844)

References

Staphylinidae
Staphylinidae genera